Ultimate Kaos (stylised as Ultimate KAOS) were a British boyband from the 1990s, who were formed by Simon Cowell. Its original members comprised Jomo Baxter, Jayde Spence, Ryan Elliott, Nick Grant and the then 9 years old Haydon Eshun.

Career
In 1992, the band were originally known as Chaos, but their only single issued under this name was a cover version of the Michael Jackson song "Farewell My Summer Love". Before they released the single, they were Sinitta's backing dancers, as Sinitta at the time, was dating Cowell. Haydon Eshun had previously appeared on Michael Barrymore's TV programme showcasing British talent.

Ultimate Kaos found success early on with hits such as "Some Girls", following their support to Take That on their 1994 UK tour. The Ultimate Kaos fanbase spread into Europe and brought them hits in Germany, Austria, Sweden, France and Belgium.  At one point, during the height of their success, they were featured on BBC Television's Top of the Pops, when their average age, as a band, was fourteen. The group released their first album, Ultimate Kaos, in 1995 and it included the hits "Hoochie Booty" and "Show a Little Love". The group released their second album, The Kaos Theory in 1996. This included the hits "Casanova" (a cover of LeVert's 1987 hit), "My Lover", and "Anything You Want (I've Got It)". They also appeared on the Childliners' record, "The Gift of Christmas".

After they split up in 1999, Eshun appeared on the television programme, Reborn in the USA, and also attempted to enter the Eurovision Song Contest.

Eshun released a solo album titled Justice in 2009 and is currently appearing in the West End stage musical Thriller – Live in London.

Discography

Albums

Singles

References

External links 
 Ultimate Kaos' Website
 Discography
 News – Haydon – Official Website

Musical groups established in 1992
Musical groups disestablished in 1999
English pop music groups
English boy bands
British contemporary R&B musical groups
Black British musical groups
New jack swing music groups
Child musical groups
Sony Music UK artists